The 1976 Polish Speedway season was the 1976 season of motorcycle speedway in Poland.

Individual

Polish Individual Speedway Championship
The 1976 Individual Speedway Polish Championship final was held on 22 June at Gorzów.

Golden Helmet
The 1976 Golden Golden Helmet organised by the Polish Motor Union (PZM) was the 1976 event for the league's leading riders.

Calendar

Final classification

Junior Championship
 winner - Wiesław Patynek

Silver Helmet
 winner - Mariusz Okoniewski

Bronze Helmet
 winner - Alfred Siekierka

Pairs

Polish Pairs Speedway Championship
The 1976 Polish Pairs Speedway Championship was the 1976 edition of the Polish Pairs Speedway Championship. The final was held on 22 August at Gdańsk.

Team

Team Speedway Polish Championship
The 1976 Team Speedway Polish Championship was the 1976 edition of the Team Polish Championship. 

Stal Gorzów Wielkopolski won the gold medal for the second successive year. The team included Edward Jancarz, Zenon Plech and Jerzy Rembas.

First League

Second League

References

Poland Individual
Poland Team
Speedway
1976 in Polish speedway